Neptis sankara, the broad-banded sailer, is a species of nymphalid butterfly found in the Indomalayan realm.

Subspecies
Neptis sankara sankara
Neptis sankara amba Moore, 1858 (Assam, Nepal and possibly north-eastern Burma)
Neptis sankara peninsularis Eliot, 1969 (Peninsular Malaya)
Neptis sankara yamari Fruhstorfer, 1908 (Sumatra (Battak Mountains))
Neptis sankara shirakiana Matsumura, 1929 (Taiwan)
Neptis sankara antonia Oberthür, 1876 (western China)
Neptis sankara guiltoides Tytler, 1940 (Burma, Thailand, Yunnan)
Neptis sankara xishuanbannaensis Yoshino, 1997 (Yunnan)

References

sankara
Butterflies of Indochina